Aarakshan is a 2011 Indian Hindi-language drama film starring Amitabh Bachchan, Saif Ali Khan, Manoj Bajpayee, Deepika Padukone, and Prateik Babbar. Directed by Prakash Jha, the film is a socio-political drama based on the controversial policy of caste based reservations in Indian government jobs and educational institutions. The film was released on 12 August 2011 to mostly mixed reviews. It was a Below Average at the box office.

Plot
In 2008, Deepak Kumar (Saif Ali Khan) an MSc topper, is at an interview for the teacher's post at an affluent school. The interviewers turn him down when they discover his low-caste roots. Deepak relates the incident to his mentor, Dr. Prabhakar Anand (Amitabh Bachchan). Dr Anand, the legendary principal of renowned STM college, where Deepak studied, offers Deepak an interim job as a teacher at STM. Deepak is comforted by his friend, Sushant (Prateik Babbar), an upper-caste boy, and his girlfriend Poorvi (Deepika Padukone), who is Dr. Anand's daughter.

The state minister, Baburam, wishes to enroll his no-good nephew at STM. Dr. Anand however, turns him down. The minister decides to install his own man, Mithilesh Singh (Manoj Bajpayee), on the STM college board. Cunning and greedy, Mithilesh seeks only to enrich himself. The minister's grand ambition is to build a multi-billion educational conglomerate, and plans to use Mithilesh's outside business—a coaching class—for it.

The Supreme Court grants reservations for Other Backward Classes. A large crowd of STM students, boisterously celebrating the ruling, arrive at the gates of STM and start a ruckus. Sushant gathers a group of upper-caste boys and tries to drive off the revellers. Dr. Anand hauls Deepak and Sushant, but is shocked to find that Deepak has turned on him. Poorvi later confronts Deepak and orders him to apologise to her father, but he refuses, leading to their break-up.

The backward classes welcome reservations because it provides additional opportunities for education. The upper classes are against reservations because they do not believe in effectiveness of Reservation System. These arguments are played out between Sushant and Deepak. The moderate STM administrators are afraid that college-level reservations may create conflicts between the students. When asked by a reporter, Dr. Anand shares his personal opinion – that some form of reservation, free of politics and economics, is good for society. The next day's headlines scream that Dr. Anand favours reservations. The STM board is outraged; Dr. Anand is warned that Mithilesh will use this to oust him. Dr. Anand resigns from STM, and Mithilesh is appointed as the new principal. Sushant soon realizes that Dr. Anand's intention is not bad and that he does not have caste feeling.

Dr. Anand to his shock finds that his house is being used for K.K coaching classes, which is linked to Mithilesh. Earlier Dr. Anand signs an agreement that he will be the guarantee for the bank loan taken by his friend, and allows his friend's sons to stay in that house for 2 years but they use it to earn money by allowing K.K coaching classes inside the house. Dr. Anand's house lands in civil court case and no lawyer is ready to go against Mithilesh. Meanwhile, Deepak who is in United States finds that Dr. Anand has resigned from STM, immediately comes to India, enraged Deepak goes to that house and takes law into his own hands by trying to evacuate people related to K.K coaching classes. Police arrest Deepak, but later Deepak is released on bail by Sushant.

Dr Anand resolves to take out Mithilesh with the only weapon left: teaching. His first success is Muniya (Aanchal Munjal), Shambhu's daughter who comes in first place at the board exam. Muniya's principal offers to send more students to Dr. Anand's  school. Deepak and Sushant return to Dr. Anand and join forces, teaching at the ta school. The  students fare much better at the exams than their classmates. The  school's reputation grows and begins to draw away students at Mithilesh's coaching class.

Mithilesh responds by obtaining a legal permit to demolish the cowshed. The situation is diffused by the arrival of Shakuntala Tai, the reclusive magnate who started the STM institutions. She calls the chief minister, who promptly averts the destruction of the cowshed. Mithilesh is dismissed, and Dr. Anand is installed as the chief trustee of the STM and lifelong principal of the newly created STM Remedial Center.

Cast
 Amitabh Bachchan as Dr. Prabhakar Anand
 Saif Ali Khan as Deepak Kumar
 Manoj Bajpayee as Mithilesh Kumar Singh, the main antagonist
 Deepika Padukone as Poorvi Anand
 Prateik Babbar as Sushant Seth
 Tanvi Azmi as Kavita Anand, Dr. Prabhakar's wife
 Mukesh Tiwari as ACP Shaktinath Thakur
 Yashpal Sharma as Shambhunath Yadav
 Darshan Jariwala as Anirudh Prasad Chaudhary 
 Rajeev Verma as Damodar Seth, Sushant's father
 Saurabh Shukla as Education Minister Baburam Tiwari
 Sonal Jha as Shanti Bua
 Amitosh Nagpal as Panditji
 Hema Malini as Shakuntala Thakral (Tai), Central Minister (special appearance)
Anita Kanwar as Mrs. Kantaprasad
 Chetan Pandit as Professor Dinkar
 Indira Tiwari as Tabela Topper Student
 Vinay Apte as local MLA
 Anita Kanwal
 S. M. Zaheer
 Aanchal Munjal as Muniya S. Yadav
 Rahul Daksh as Surendar
 Sumeet Vyas as Teacher
 Sachin Chaubey
 Amit Singh Thakur as Principal
 Deepraj Rana as Sanjay Tandon
 Bikramjeet Kanwarpal

Production
Shooting began on 15 January 2011. Director Prakash Jha finished casting but the male lead was not finalised. Ajay Devgan was first considered for the role, however Ajay had many other projects in hand, including Golmaal 3 and Singham. So Jha decided to cast Saif Ali Khan. Khan found it very hard to juggle between two films at once because he had to learn Sanskrit for his role in the film. Bachchan and Saif Ali Khan learnt teaching skills in mathematics from Bihar's Super 30 founder Anand Kumar. Most of the film's shooting took place in Minal Residency, Oriental College, Upper Lake in Bhopal. The shooting finished in early March 2011.

Reception

Critical reception
Aarakshan mostly garnered mixed reviews. Taran Adarsh of Bollywood Hungama rated it with 4 stars and said – "On the whole, Aarakshan communicates an engaging story with very relatable characters. It's a movie that is truly inspiring and thought-provoking, but at the same time, its running time [almost 2.45 hours] is a deterrent.(...) Aarakshan not only works as a film, but also as a tool to drive home a forceful message. It's a daring, heroic, commanding and an engaging film that shouldn't be missed!". He also praised the performance of the leads. Nikhat Kazmi of The Times of India gave it 3 stars and said – "Sad. Because as a film on the issue of reservation, Aarakshan was rocking till the first half. But as an omnibus on the travails of India's education system, it flounders into no-man's land. Watch it for the intermittent high drama and the gritty performances, scattered as they are." Shivesh Kumar of IndiaWeekly awarded the movie 3 out of 5 stars. Dainik Bhaskar awarded three stars in their review and wrote – "Watch it for the conflicts between the characters and an outstanding performance by Amitabh Bachchan. On the flipside, if you expect drama and finesse that you witnessed in Prakash Jha's last release 'Rajneeti', you will be disappointed." Vandana Krishnan from Behindwoods rated it 1.5/5 and said that the film represents "Great bottle bad wine" further citing "Overall, the film falls short of the expectations the trailer, start cast and story had created."
Saibal Chatterjee from NDTV gave it 2.5 out of 5 stars and said: "Given all the pre-release brouhaha over its emotive subject matter (leading to several states banning its public screening), Aarakshan is quite a copout. It ends up being more about the depredations of the nation’s education mafia than the vexed question of job and college quotas for backward caste candidates and its fallout. The basic premise is rooted in the real world all right and the film might touch some raw nerves. But the dramatisation of the conflict over the quota raj that divides India down the middle tends to border on the excessively shrill, if not completely shallow." Central Board of Film Certification (CBFC) chairman Leela Samson said that Aarakshan was a good film about education but "unfortunately hit troubled political situations". The controversial film has received a compliment from unlikely quarters in Chhattisgarh with the state Scheduled Tribes Commission seeking a tax-free status for the Amitabh Bachchan starrer.

Sukanya Venkatraghavan of Filmfare gave it 2 stars out of 5, stating "The problem with Aarakshan is its meandering graph. It starts off solidly enough, keeping up a pace that will engross you until interval time except for two totally unnecessary songs. From there on, the film sheds its theme of ideals and becomes a one on one contest that, to put it really tritely, is a tug of war between two coaching classes. The dialogue is strong and opinionated and actors like Saif Ali Khan and Manoj Bajpai do everything to get you to like the film (...)Aarakshan has all the right intentions but it is a tad confusing in its stance. Of course ultimately it shows the triumph of selfless dedication to the cause of education and there is no faulting that. One does walk away with some reservations though." Rajeev Masand of CNN-IBN gave it 2 out of 5 stars, calling it "a deathly boring slog" and adding: "With so much to say, the movie drags on endlessly, with over-written scenes, over-the-top emotions and dialogues that are so heavy, they end up being inaccessible. Of the performances, every actor seems to go through the motions and only Manoj Bajpai inserts some spark onto the screen. 'Aarakshan' is well-intentioned, but you can't shake off the feeling that you're trapped by a three-hour-long tirade. I'm going with a generous two out of five for Prakash Jha's 'Aarakshan'. If you don't want to be lectured, stay at home."

Box office

India
Aarakshan released in 1085 cinemas across India. The film saw 50–70% occupancy on its first day of release, while in Delhi, it opened at around 60–70%. The film's business was affected due to the bans imposed on its screening in Punjab, UP and Andhra. It went on to collect Rs 44.7 million on the first day. The opening weekend collections of the film were around Rs 183.3 million. The film grossed Rs 375.3 million net on Indian box office in two weeks. Aarakshan added around Rs 30 million net in its third week to go to Rs 405.0 million net in three weeks. The film added Rs 5.8 millions net in India to go to Rs 423.8 million net in four weeks. The film added 
Rs 500,000 net in India to go to Rs 424.3 million net in five weeks.

Overseas
Moreover, the film fared poorly in the overseas markets. It grossed £76,000 in the United Kingdom, $345,000 in North America, $190,000 in UAE and $82,000 in Australia, taking its total overseas gross to $900,000 over its first weekend. In its third weekend, the film collected £13,085 on 42 screens at the UK box office with a total of £ [approx. Rs 12.7 million], Australian $ [approx. Rs 6926,000] in two weeks at the Australian box office. Aarakshan'''s total worldwide net collections after three weeks were Rs 645 million making it a below average movie.

Soundtrack

The soundtrack was composed by Shankar–Ehsaan–Loy. The album consists of six tracks. The soundtrack features the vocal talents of Mohit Chauhan, Shreya Ghoshal, Mahalakshmi Iyer, Raman Mahadevan, Shankar Mahadevan and classical singer Channulal Mishra. The concept of the song "Kaun Si Dor" was from Prasoon Joshi, the songwriter of the album who came up with the first lines of the song. The trio then went on to develop the song and roped in Channulal Mishra, who agreed to sing the song as per their request. The soundtrack was released on 11 July 2011.

Reception
Upon release, the album received generally mixed reviews from the critics. Joginder Tuteja of Bollywood hungama gave it 2 out of 5 stars and said: "Aarakshan doesn't boast of the kind of score that has in it to make waves commercially since almost all songs mainly have a situational appeal to them. Yes, at least 'Achha Lagta Hai' is good that prevents Aarakshan from becoming totally forgettable. However despite low expectations from the soundtrack here, the end result is far more being satisfactory." Planet Bollywood felt that Prasoon Joshi – Shankar–Ehsaan–Loy "failed to create the same magic as in Taare Zameen Par." Sheetal Tiwari of Bollyspice, in her review, described the soundtrack as "brilliant with an astounding lyrical quality." She also praised the composer trio for "their versatility to compose for any subject." It won the Best song award for "Mauka" in IRDS Film awards 2011 by Institute for Research and Documentation in Social Sciences (IRDS), a Lucknow-based Civil society for depicting the contradictory positions being taken on reservation by its opponents and supporters

 Accolades 

Controversy
In early May 2011, civic authorities in Bhopal bulldozed the sets of Aarakshan because it was erected on disputed land.

Some pro-Dalit groups in Kanpur protested Saif Ali Khan being cast in the role of a Dalit. They objected to the actor's royal background and saw his role of a so-called Dalit as an insult to the community.

The film was banned in Uttar Pradesh, Punjab and Andhra Pradesh before its theatrical release. The Punjab government banned the film on fears that certain scenes and dialogues in the film may inflame the passion of some communities in Punjab. Mayawati government banned the film in UP for two months on grounds that it could create law and order problem in the state.

National Commission for Scheduled Castes (NCSC) viewed the movie after getting complaints of its objectionable content. "While the overall theme of the film is not objectionable, it is loaded with anti-Dalit and anti-reservation dialogues," said NCSC chairman P.L. Punia. However, the Board, which granted the film a U/A certification, said it would defend Jha's right to free expression. In reply to this, the director decided to remove 'objectionable' scenes from the film in a bid to prevent further backlash. Prakash Jha and producers of Aarakshan moved the Supreme Court to lift the ban on the film in the three states. Supreme Court lifted the ban on Aarakshan'' in Uttar Pradesh later.

Apart from the aforementioned announced bans, there was an unexpected mid screening ban on the film in the multiplexes of Gurgaon, on the night of its release.

References

External links
 
 
 
 
 
 

2011 films
2010s political drama films
2010s Hindi-language films
Works about reservation in India
Films directed by Prakash Jha
Films about the caste system in India
Films about corruption in India
Films about the education system in India
Indian political drama films
Reliance Entertainment films
2011 drama films
Hindi-language drama films